Puthoorppilly Sreekrishna temple is located at Manjapra, a small village in Ernakulam District, Kerala, India. This temple is a protected monument by Archeological Department, Kerala. The deity at this temple is Lord Krishna.

Gallery

References

Krishna temples
Hindu temples in Ernakulam district